Grape Creek is a stream in the U.S. state of North Carolina. It is a tributary to the Hiwassee River.

Grape Creek was named for the wild grapes which once abounded there.

References

Rivers of North Carolina
Rivers of Cherokee County, North Carolina